Dred: A Tale of the Great Dismal Swamp is the second popular novel from American author Harriet Beecher Stowe.  It was first published in two volumes by Phillips, Sampson and Company in 1856. Although it enjoyed better initial sales than her previous, and more famous, novel Uncle Tom's Cabin, it was ultimately less popular. Dred was of a more documentary nature than Uncle Tom's Cabin and thus lacked a character like Uncle Tom to evoke strong emotion from readers.

Plot summary

Dred is the story of Nina Gordon, an impetuous young heiress to a large southern plantation, whose land is rapidly becoming worthless.  It is run competently by one of Nina's slaves, Harry, who endures a murderous rivalry with Nina's brother Tom Gordon, a drunken, cruel slaveowner.  Nina is a flighty young girl, and maintains several suitors, before finally settling down with a man named Clayton.  Clayton is socially and religiously liberal, and very idealistic, and has a down-to-earth perpetual-virgin sister, Anne.

In addition to Harry (who, as well as being  the administrator of Nina's estate, is secretly also her and Tom's half-brother), the slave characters include the devoutly Christian Milly (actually the property of Nina's Aunt Nesbit), and Tomtit, a joker-type character. There is also a family of poor whites, who have but a single, devoted slave, Old Tiff.

Dred, the titular character, is one of the Great Dismal Swamp maroons, escaped slaves living in the Great Dismal Swamp, preaching angry and violent retribution for the evils of slavery and rescuing escapees from the dog of the slavecatchers.

Major themes
The response to Stowe's first work greatly impacted her second anti-slavery novel.  Uncle Tom's Cabin drew criticism from abolitionists and African-American authors for the passive martyrdom of Uncle Tom and endorsement of colonization as the solution to slavery.  Dred, by contrast, introduces a black revolutionary character who is presented as an heir to the American revolution rather than a problem to be expatriated.  Dred can thus be placed within an African-American literary tradition as well as a political revision of the sentimental novel (see David Walker's Appeal (1829) and Frederick Douglass's The Heroic Slave (1852)).

Dred himself is a composite of Denmark Vesey and Nat Turner, two real leaders of slave insurrections. Stowe included a copy of Nat Turner's famous confessions as an appendix to the novel.

One often-overlooked subplot involves Judge Clayton, who issues a proslavery opinion that absolves the man who attacked Cora's slave Milly of liability.  This judge was constrained by the law from providing relief; this fits with Stowe's belief that law and judges—and religious leaders, too—could not be expected to help end slavery.  It was humane sentiments rather than the rule of law that would be the lever for antislavery action.

The novel is also interesting in the historical context of runaway slave communities surviving for a long time in swamp areas. Swamps were places where runaway slaves could hide, and therefore became a taboo subject, particularly in the south. The best hiding places were found on high ground in swampy areas. The novel also contains detailed descriptions of the wetlands in the "Dismal Swamp" and is therefore also interesting in the context of the way in which African Americans relate to the natural environment.

References

Further reading
 
Delombard, Jeannine Marie. "Representing the Slave: White Advocacy and Black Testimony in Harriet Beecher Stowe's Dred." New England Quarterly 75.1 (2002): 80-106.
Grant, David. "Stowe's Dred and the Narrative Logic of Slavery's Extension." Studies in American Fiction 28.2 (2000): 151-78.
Hamilton, Cynthia S. "Dred: Intemperate Slavery." Journal of American Studies 34.2 (2000): 257-77.
Karafilis, Maria. "Spaces of Democracy in Harriet Beecher Stowe's Dred." Arizona Quarterly: A Journal of American Literature, Culture, and Theory 55.3 (1999): 23-49.
Levine, Robert. Introduction. Dred: A Tale of the Great Dismal Swamp.  Harriet Beecher Stowe.  New York & London:  Penguin Books 2000.  ix-xxxv. 
Otter, Samuel. "Stowe and Race."  The Cambridge Companion to Harriet Beecher Stowe. Ed. by Cindy Weinstein. Cambridge Companions to Literature (Cctl). Cambridge, England: Cambridge UP, 2004. 15-38.   (pbk.)
Newman, Judie, and Cindy Weinstein. "Staging Black Insurrection: Dred on Stage."  The Cambridge Companion to Harriet Beecher Stowe. Cambridge Companions to Literature (Cctl). Cambridge, England: Cambridge UP, 2004. 113-30.   (pbk.)
Rowe, John Carlos. "Stowe's Rainbow Sign: Violence and Community in Dred: A Tale of the Great Dismal Swamp (1856)." Arizona Quarterly: A Journal of American Literature, Culture, and Theory 58.1 (2002): 37-55.
Smith, Gail K. "Reading with the Other: Hermeneutics and the Politics of Difference in Stowe's Dred." American Literature: A Journal of Literary History, Criticism, and Bibliography 69.2 (1997): 289-313.

External links
Full text (and some page images) of the first edition, 1856: Volume I; Volume II; at the Documenting the American South web site of the University Library, The University of North Carolina at Chapel Hill.
Full Text of both volumes at Wright American Fiction 1851-1875.
 
LibriVox recording(s) at the Internet Archive.
Recording(s) at LibriVox.

1856 American novels
Great Dismal Swamp
Novels about American slavery
Novels by Harriet Beecher Stowe